Pancho is a male nickname for the given name Francisco (Spanish and Portuguese equivalent of Francis). The feminine form is Pancha. It is also sometimes used as a surname. Notable people with the name include:

Given name
Pancho Barnes (1901–1975), early female American aviator
Pancho Carter (born 1950), American retired race car driver
Pancho Coimbre (1909–1989), Puerto Rican baseball player
Pancho Córdova (1916–1990), Mexican character actor
Pancho Daniel (died 1858), bandit in what is now California
Pancho Fierro (c. 1807/1809–1879), Peruvian painter
Pancho Gonzales (1928–1995), American tennis player
Pancho Gonzales (footballer) (1926–2016), Argentine football player, and manager
Pancho Guedes (1925–2015), Portuguese architect, sculptor, and painter
Francisco Guilledo (1901–1925), Filipino world champion boxer
Pancho Herrera (1934–2005), Major League Baseball player
Franklin Huddle (born 1943), American diplomat
Pancho Martin (1925–2012), trainer of thoroughbred racehorses
Pancho Prin (1930–2003), Venezuelan musician, singer, and composer
Ferenc Puskás (1927–2006), Hungarian footballer
Francisco Ramírez (governor) (1786–1821), Argentine provincial governor
José Francisco Ramírez (born 1976), Honduran footballer
Pancho Segura (1921–2017), Ecuadorian-born American tennis player
Francisco Varallo (1910–2010), Argentine footballer
Pancho Villa (1878–1923), Mexican revolutionary
Pancho Vladigerov (1899–1978), Bulgarian composer, pianist, and pedagogue

Stage name
Michael Locke (stuntman) (born 1979), a stuntman on the Welsh television programme Dirty Sanchez

Fictional characters
Pancho, sidekick of The Cisco Kid
Pancho, in the Spanish language children's television series Plaza Sésamo
Pancho, character in the Townes Van Zandt song Pancho and Lefty

Surname
Cassa Pancho, founder of British ballet company Ballet Black
Pedro Pancho (born 1934), Filipino politician

See also
Pancha (disambiguation), female given name

Spanish-language hypocorisms